The three independent Baltic countries – Estonia, Latvia, and Lithuania – were invaded and occupied in June 1940 by the Soviet Union, under the leadership of Stalin and auspices of the Molotov-Ribbentrop Pact that had been signed between Nazi Germany and the Soviet Union in August 1939, immediately before the outbreak of World War II. The three countries were then annexed into the Soviet Union (formally as "constituent republics") in August 1940. The United States and most other Western countries never recognised this incorporation, considering it illegal. On 22 June 1941, Nazi Germany attacked the Soviet Union and within weeks occupied the Baltic territories. In July 1941, the Third Reich incorporated the Baltic territory into its Reichskommissariat Ostland. As a result of the Red Army's Baltic Offensive of 1944, the Soviet Union recaptured most of the Baltic states and trapped the remaining German forces in the Courland Pocket until their formal surrender in May 1945.

During the 1944–1991 Soviet occupation large numbers of people from Russia and other parts of the former USSR were settled in the three Baltic countries, while the local languages, religion and customs were suppressed. David Chioni Moore classified it as a "reverse-cultural colonization", where the colonized perceived the colonizers as culturally inferior. Colonization of the three Baltic countries was closely tied to mass executions, deportations and repression of the native population. During both Soviet occupations (1940–1941; 1944–1991) a combined 605,000 inhabitants of the three countries were either killed or deported (135,000 Estonians, 170,000 Latvians and 320,000 Lithuanians), while their properties and personal belongings, along with ones who fled the country, were confiscated and given to the arriving colonists – Soviet military and NKVD personnel, as well as functionaries of the Communist Party and economic migrants.

The Baltic states' governments themselves, the United States and its courts of law, the European Parliament, the European Court of Human Rights and the United Nations Human Rights Council have all stated that these three countries were invaded, occupied and illegally incorporated into the Soviet Union under provisions of the 1939 Molotov–Ribbentrop Pact. There followed occupation by Nazi Germany from 1941 to 1944 and then again occupation by the Soviet Union from 1944 to 1991. This policy of non-recognition has given rise to the principle of legal continuity of the Baltic states, which holds that de jure, or as a matter of law, the Baltic states had remained independent states under illegal occupation throughout the period from 1940 to 1991.

In its reassessment of Soviet history that began during perestroika in 1989, the Soviet Union condemned the 1939 secret protocol between Germany and itself. However, the Soviet Union never formally acknowledged its presence in the Baltics as an occupation or that it annexed these states and considered the Estonian, Latvian and Lithuanian Soviet Socialist Republics as three of its constituent republics. On the other hand, the Russian Soviet Federative Socialist Republic recognized in 1991 the events of 1940 as "annexation". Historically revisionist Russian historiography and school textbooks continue to maintain that the Baltic states voluntarily joined the Soviet Union after their peoples all carried out socialist revolutions independent of Soviet influence. The post-Soviet government of Russia and its state officials insist that incorporation of the Baltic states was in accordance with international law and gained de jure recognition by the agreements made in the February 1945 Yalta and the July–August 1945 Potsdam conferences and by the 1975 Helsinki Accords, which declared the inviolability of existing frontiers. However, Russia agreed to Europe's demand to "assist persons deported from the occupied Baltic states" upon joining the Council of Europe in 1996. Additionally, when the Russian Soviet Federative Socialist Republic signed a separate treaty with Lithuania in 1991, it acknowledged that the 1940 annexation as a violation of Lithuanian sovereignty and recognised the de jure continuity of the Lithuanian state.

Most Western governments maintained that Baltic sovereignty had not been legitimately overridden and thus continued to recognise the Baltic states as sovereign political entities represented by the legations—appointed by the pre-1940 Baltic states—which functioned in Washington and elsewhere. The Baltic states recovered de facto independence  in 1991 during the dissolution of the Soviet Union. Russia started to withdraw its troops from the Baltics (starting from Lithuania) in August 1993. The full withdrawal of troops deployed by Moscow ended in August 1994. Russia officially ended its military presence in the Baltics in August 1998 by decommissioning the Skrunda-1 radar station in Latvia. The dismantled installations were repatriated to Russia and the site returned to Latvian control, with the last Russian soldier leaving Baltic soil in October 1999.

Background

Early in the morning of 24 August 1939, the Soviet Union and Germany signed a ten-year non-aggression pact, called the Molotov–Ribbentrop pact. The pact contained a secret protocol by which the states of Northern and Eastern Europe were divided into German and Soviet "spheres of influence". In the north, Finland, Estonia and Latvia were assigned to the Soviet sphere. Poland was to be partitioned in the event of its "political rearrangement"—the areas east of the Narev, Vistula and San Rivers going to the Soviet Union while Germany would occupy the west. Lithuania, adjacent to East Prussia, would be in the German sphere of influence, although a second secret protocol agreed in September 1939 assigned the majority of Lithuanian territory to the Soviet Union. According to this secret protocol, Lithuania would regain its historical capital Vilnius, previously subjugated during the inter-war period by Poland.

Following the end of the Soviet invasion of Poland on 6 October, the Soviets pressured Finland and the Baltic states to conclude mutual assistance treaties. The Soviets questioned the neutrality of Estonia after the escape of an interned Polish submarine on 18 September. A week later on 24 September, the Estonian foreign minister was given an ultimatum in Moscow. The Soviets demanded the conclusion of a treaty of mutual assistance to establish military bases in Estonia. The Estonians were thus coerced to accept naval, air and army bases on two Estonian islands and at the port of Paldiski. The corresponding agreement was signed on 28 September 1939. Latvia followed on 5 October 1939 and Lithuania shortly thereafter, on 10 October 1939. The agreements permitted the Soviet Union to establish military bases on the Baltic states' territory for the duration of the European war and to station 25,000 Soviet soldiers in Estonia, 30,000 in Latvia and 20,000 in Lithuania from October 1939.

Soviet occupation and annexation (1940–1941)

In September and October 1939, the Soviet government compelled the Baltic states to conclude mutual assistance pacts which gave it the right to establish Soviet military bases. In May 1940, the Soviets turned to the idea of direct military intervention, but still intended to rule through puppet regimes. Their model was the Finnish Democratic Republic, a puppet regime set up by the Soviets on the first day of the Winter War. The Soviets organised a press campaign against the allegedly pro-Allied sympathies of the Baltic governments. In May 1940, the Germans invaded France, which was overrun and occupied a month later. In late May and early June 1940, the Baltic states were accused of military collaboration against the Soviet Union by holding meetings the previous winter. On 15 June 1940, the Lithuanian government was extorted to agree to the Soviet ultimatum and permit the entry of an unspecified number of Soviet troops. President Antanas Smetona proposed armed resistance to the Soviets but the government refused, proposing their own candidate to lead the regime. However, the Soviets refused this offer and sent Vladimir Dekanozov to take charge of affairs while the Red Army occupied the state.

On 16 June 1940, Latvia and Estonia also received ultimata. The Red Army occupied the two remaining Baltic states shortly thereafter. The Soviets dispatched Andrey Vyshinsky to oversee the takeover of Latvia and Andrey Zhdanov to oversee the takeover of Estonia. On 18 and 21 June 1940, new "popular front" governments were formed in each Baltic country, made up of Communists and fellow travelers. Under Soviet surveillance, the new governments arranged rigged elections for new "people's assemblies." Voters were presented with a single list, and no opposition movements were allowed to file and to get the required turnout to 99.6% votes were forged. A month later, the new assemblies met, with their sole item of business being resolutions to join the Soviet Union. In each case, the resolutions passed by acclamation. The Supreme Soviet of the Soviet Union duly accepted the requests in August, thus sanctioning them under Soviet law. Lithuania was incorporated into the Soviet Union on 3 August, Latvia on 5 August, and Estonia on 6 August 1940. The deposed presidents of Estonia (Konstantin Päts) and Latvia (Kārlis Ulmanis) were imprisoned and deported to the USSR and died later in the Tver region and Central Asia respectively. In June 1941, the new Soviet governments carried out mass deportations of "enemies of the people". It is estimated that Estonia alone lost 60,000 citizens. Consequently, many Balts initially greeted the Germans as liberators when they invaded a week later.

The Soviet Union immediately started to erect border fortifications along its newly acquired western border — the so-called Molotov Line.

German occupation (1941–1944)

Ostland province and the Holocaust

On 22 June 1941 the Germans invaded the Soviet Union. The Baltic states, recently Sovietized by threats, force, and fraud, generally welcomed the German armed forces when they crossed the frontiers. In Lithuania, a revolt broke out and an independent provisional government was established. As the German armies approached Riga and Tallinn, attempts to reestablish national governments were made. It was hoped that the Germans would reestablish Baltic independence. Such political hopes soon evaporated and Baltic cooperation became less forthright or ceased altogether. The Germans aimed to annex the Baltic territories to the Third Reich where "suitable elements" were to be assimilated and "unsuitable elements" exterminated. In actual practice, the implementation of occupation policy was more complex; for administrative convenience the Baltic states were included with Belorussia in the Reichskommissariat Ostland. The area was ruled by Hinrich Lohse who was obsessed with bureaucratic regulations. The Baltic area was the only eastern region intended to become a full province of the Third Reich. Nazi racial attitudes to the peoples of the three Baltic countries differed between Nazi authorities. In practice, racial policies were directed not against the majority of Balts but rather against the Jews. Large numbers of Jews were living in the major cities, notably in Vilnius, Kaunas and Riga. The German mobile killing units slaughtered hundreds of thousands of Jews; Einsatzgruppe A, assigned to the Baltic area, was the most effective of four units. German policy forced the Jews into ghettos. In 1943 Heinrich Himmler ordered his forces to liquidate the ghettos and to transfer the survivors to concentration camps. Some Latvians and Lithuanian conscripts collaborated actively in the killing of Jews, and the Nazis managed to provoke pogroms locally, especially in Lithuania. Only about 75 percent of Estonian and 10 percent of Latvian and Lithuanian Jews survived the war. However, for the majority of Lithuanians, Latvians and Estonians, the German rule was less harsh than Soviet rule had been, and it was less brutal than German occupations elsewhere in eastern Europe. Local puppet regimes performed administrative tasks and schools were permitted to function. However, most people were denied the right to own land or businesses.

Baltic nationals within the Soviet forces

The Soviet administration had forcefully incorporated the Baltic national armies at the wake of the occupation in 1940. Most of the senior officers were arrested and many of them murdered. During the German invasion, the Soviets conducted a forced general mobilisation that took place in violation of the international law. Under the Geneva Conventions, this act of violence is seen as a grave breach and war crime, because the mobilised men were treated as arrestants from the very beginning. In comparison with the general mobilisation proclaimed in the Soviet Union, the age range was extended by 9 years in the Baltics; all reserve officers were also taken. The aim was to deport all men capable to fight to Russia, where they were sent to convict camps. Almost half of them perished because of the transportation conditions, slave labour, hunger, diseases, and the repressive measures of the NKVD. In addition, destruction battalions were formed under the command of the NKVD. Hence, Baltic nationals fought in both German and Soviet army ranks. There was the 201st Latvian Rifle Division. The 308th Latvian Rifle Division was awarded the Red Banner Order after the expulsion of the Germans from Riga in the autumn of 1944.

An estimated 60,000 Lithuanians were drafted into the Red Army. During 1940, on the basis of disbanded Lithuanian Army, Soviet authorities organized 29th Territorial Rifle Corps. Decrease in quality of life and service conditions, forceful indoctrination of Communist ideology, caused discontent of recently Sovietized military units. Soviet authorities responded with repressions against Lithuanian officers of the 29th Corps, arresting over 100 officers and soldiers and subsequently executing around 20 in Autumn 1940. By that time allegedly near 3,200 officers and soldiers of 29th Corps were considered "politically unreliable". Due to high tensions and soldiers' discontent the 26th Cavalry Regiment was disbanded. During the 1941 June deportations over 320 officers and soldiers of 29th Corps were arrested and deported to concentration camps or executed. The 29th Corps collapsed with the German invasion into Soviet Union: on June 25–26 a rebellion broke in its 184th Rifle Division. The other division of the 29th Corps, the 179th Rifle Division lost most of its soldiers during the retreat from Germans mostly to deserting of its soldiers. A total of less than 1,500 soldiers from initial strength of around 12,000 reached the area of Pskov by August 1941. By the second part of 1942, most of Lithuanians remaining in the Soviet ranks as well as male war refugees from Lithuania were organized into 16th Rifle Division during its second formation. 16th Rifle Division, despite officially called "Lithuanian" and mostly commanded by officers of Lithuanian origin, including Adolfas Urbšas, was ethnically very mixed, with up to 1/4 of its personnel made of Jews and thus being the largest Jew formation of Soviet Army. Popular joke of those years said that 16th Division is called Lithuanian, because there are 16 Lithuanians among its ranks.

The 7000-strong 22nd Estonian Territorial Rifle Corps got heavily beaten in the battles around Porkhov during the German invasion in summer 1941, as 2000 were killed or wounded in action, and 4500 surrendered. The 25,000—30,000 strong 8th Estonian Rifle Corps lost 3/4 of its troops in the Battle of Velikiye Luki in winter 1942/43. It participated in the capture of Tallinn in September 1944. About 20,000 Lithuanians, 25,000 Estonians, and 5000 Latvians died in the ranks of the Red Army and labor battalions.

Baltic nationals within the German forces

The Nazi administration also conscripted Baltic nationals into the German armies. The Lithuanian Territorial Defense Force, composed of volunteers, was formed in 1944. The LTDF reached the size of about 10,000 men. Its goal was to fight the approaching Red Army, provide security and conduct anti-partisan operations within the territory, claimed by Lithuanians. After brief engagements against the Soviet and Polish partisans, the force self-disbanded, its leaders were arrested and sent to Nazi concentration camps, and many of its members were executed by the Nazis. Latvian Legion, created in 1943, consisted of two conscripted divisions of the Waffen-SS. On 1 July 1944 the Latvian Legion had 87,550 men. Another 23,000 Latvians were serving as Wehrmacht "auxiliaries". Among other battles they participated in the battles in the Siege of Leningrad, in Courland Pocket, in Pomeranian Wall defences, in Velikaya River for Hill "93,4" and in the defence of Berlin. 20th Waffen Grenadier Division of the SS (1st Estonian) was formed in January 1944 through conscription. Consisting of 38,000 men they took part in the Battle of Narva, the Battle of Tannenberg Line, the Battle of Tartu, and Operation Aster.

Attempts to restore independence and the Soviet offensive of 1944

There were several attempts to restore independence during the occupation. On 22 June 1941 the Lithuanians overthrew Soviet rule two days before the Wehrmacht arrived in Kaunas, where the Germans then allowed a Provisional Government to function for over a month. The Latvian Central Council was set up as an underground organisation in 1943, but it was destroyed by the Gestapo in 1945. In Estonia in 1941, Jüri Uluots proposed restoration of independence; later, by 1944, he had become a key figure in the secret National Committee. In September 1944, Uluots briefly became acting president of independent Estonia. Unlike the French and the Poles, the Baltic states had no governments in exile located in the West. Consequently, Great Britain and the United States lacked any interest in the Baltic cause while the war against Germany remained undecided. The discovery of the Katyn massacre in 1943 and callous conduct towards the Warsaw uprising in 1944 had cast shadows on relations; nevertheless, all three victors still displayed solidarity at the Yalta conference in 1945.

By 1 March 1944 the siege of Leningrad was over and Soviet troops were on the border with Estonia. The Soviets launched the Baltic Offensive, a twofold military-political operation to rout German forces, on 14 September. On 16 September the High Command of the German Army issued a plan in which Estonian forces would cover the German withdrawal. The Soviets soon reached the Estonian capital Tallinn, where the NKVD's first mission was to stop anyone escaping from the state; however, many refugees did manage to escape to the West. The NKVD also targeted the members of the National Committee of the Republic of Estonia. German and Latvian forces remained trapped in the Courland Pocket until the end of the war, capitulating on 10 May 1945.

Second Soviet occupation (1944–1991)

Resistance and deportations

After reoccupying the Baltic states, the Soviets implemented a program of sovietization, which was achieved through large-scale industrialisation rather than by overt attacks on culture, religion or freedom of expression. The Soviets carried out massive deportations to eliminate any resistance to collectivisation or support of partisans. Baltic partisans, such as the Forest Brothers, continued to resist Soviet rule through armed struggle for a number of years.

The Soviets had previously carried out mass deportations in 1940–41, but the deportations between 1944 and 1952 were even greater. In March 1949 alone, the top Soviet authorities organised a mass deportation of 90,000 Baltic nationals.

The total number deported in 1944–55 has been estimated at over half a million: 124,000 in Estonia, 136,000 in Latvia and 245,000 in Lithuania.

The estimated death toll among Lithuanian deportees between 1945 and 1958 was 20,000, including 5,000 children.

The deportees were allowed to return after Nikita Khrushchev's secret speech in 1956 denouncing the excesses of Stalinism, however many did not survive their years of exile in Siberia. After the war, the Soviets outlined new borders for the Baltic republics. Lithuania gained the regions of Vilnius and Klaipėda while the Russian SFSR annexed territory from the eastern parts of Estonia (5% of prewar territory) and Latvia (2%).

Industrialization and immigration
The Soviets made large capital investments for energy resources and the manufacture of industrial and agricultural products. The purpose was to integrate the Baltic economies into the larger Soviet economic sphere. In all three republics, manufacturing industry was developed resulting in some of the best industrial complexes in the sphere of electronics and textile production. The rural economy suffered from the lack of investments and the collectivization. Baltic urban areas had been damaged during wartime and it took ten years to recuperate housing losses. New constructions were often of poor quality and ethnic Russian immigrants were favored in housing. Estonia and Latvia received large-scale immigration of industrial workers from other parts of the Soviet Union that changed the demographics dramatically. Lithuania also received immigration but on a smaller scale.

Ethnic Estonians constituted 88 percent before the war, but in 1970 the figure dropped to 60 percent. Ethnic Latvians constituted 75 percent, but the figure dropped 57 percent in 1970 and further down to 50.7 percent in 1989. In contrast, the drop in Lithuania was only 4 percent. Baltic communists had supported and participated the 1917 October Revolution in Russia. However, many of them were killed during the Great Purge in the 1930s. The new regimes of 1944 were established mostly by native communists who had fought in the Red Army. However, the Soviets also imported ethnic Russians to fill political, administrative and managerial posts.

Restorations of independence

The period of stagnation brought the crisis of the Soviet system. The new Soviet leader Mikhail Gorbachev came to power in 1985 and responded with glasnost and perestroika. They were attempts to reform the Soviet system from above to avoid revolution from below. The reforms occasioned the reawakening of nationalism in the Baltic republics. The first major demonstrations against the environment were Riga in November 1986 and the following spring in Tallinn. Small successful protests encouraged key individuals and by the end of 1988 the reform wing had gained the decisive positions in the Baltic republics. At the same time, coalitions of reformists and populist forces assembled under the Popular Fronts. The Supreme Soviet of the Estonian Soviet Socialist Republic made the Estonian language the state language again in January 1989, and similar legislation was passed in Latvia and Lithuania soon after. The Baltic republics declared their aim for sovereignty: Estonia in November 1988, Lithuania in May 1989 and Latvia in July 1989. The Baltic Way, that took place on 23 August 1989, became the biggest manifestation of opposition to the Soviet rule. In December 1989, the Congress of People's Deputies of the Soviet Union condemned the Molotov–Ribbentrop Pact and its secret protocol as "legally deficient and invalid."

On 11 March 1990 the Lithuanian Supreme Soviet declared Lithuania's independence. Pro-independence candidates had received an overwhelming majority in the Supreme Soviet elections held earlier that year. On 30 March 1990, seeing full restoration of independence not yet feasible due to large Soviet presence, the Estonian Supreme Soviet declared the Soviet Union an occupying power and announced the start of a transitional period to independence. On 4 May 1990, the Latvian Supreme Soviet made a similar declaration. The Soviet Union immediately condemned all three declarations as illegal, saying that they had to go through the process of secession outlined in the Soviet Constitution of 1977. However, the Baltic states argued that the entire occupation process violated both international law and their own law. Therefore, they argued, they were merely reasserting an independence that still existed under international law.

By mid-June, after unsuccessful economic blockade of Lithuania, the Soviets started negotiations with Lithuania and the other two Baltic republics. The Soviets had a bigger challenge elsewhere, as the Russian Federal Republic proclaimed sovereignty in June. Simultaneously the Baltic republics also started to negotiate directly with the Russian Federal Republic. After the failed negotiations the Soviets made a dramatic but failed attempt to break the deadlock and sent in military troops killing twenty and injuring hundreds of civilians in what became known as the "Vilnius massacre" and "The Barricades" in Latvia during January 1991. In August 1991, the hard-line members attempted to take control of the Soviet Union. A day after the coup on 21 August, the Estonians proclaimed full independence, after an independence referendum was held in Estonia on 3 March 1991, alongside a similar referendum in Latvia the same month. It was approved by 78.4% of voters with an 82.9% turnout. Independence was restored by the Estonian Supreme Council on the night of 20 August. The Latvian parliament made similar a declaration on the same day. The coup failed but the collapse of the Soviet Union became unavoidable. After the coup collapsed, the Soviet government recognised the independence of all three Baltic states on 6 September 1991.

Withdrawal of Russian troops and decommissioning the radars
The Russian Federation assumed the burden and the subsequent withdrawal of the occupation force, consisting of about 150,000 former Soviet, now Russian, troops stationed in the Baltic states. In 1992 there were still 120,000 Russian troops there, as well as a large number of military pensioners, particularly in Estonia and Latvia.

During the period of negotiations, Russia hoped to retain facilities such as the Liepāja naval base, the Skrunda anti-ballistic missile radar station and the Ventspils space-monitoring station in Latvia and the Paldiski submarine base in Estonia, as well as transit rights to Kaliningrad through Lithuania.

Contention arose when Russia threatened to keep its troops where they were. Moscow's linkage to specific legislation guaranteeing the civil rights of ethnic Russians was seen as an implied threat in the West, in the U.N. General Assembly and by Baltic leaders, who viewed it as Russian imperialism.

Lithuania was the first to complete the withdrawal of Russian troops—on 31 August 1993—owing in part to the Kaliningrad issue.

Subsequent agreements to withdraw troops from Latvia were signed on 30 April 1994, and from Estonia on 26 July 1994. Continued linkage on the part of Russia resulted in a threat by the U.S. Senate in mid-July to halt all aid to Russia in case the forces were not withdrawn by the end of August. Final withdrawal was completed on 31 August 1994. Some Russian troops remained stationed in Estonia in Paldiski until the Russian military base was dismantled and the nuclear reactors suspended operations on 26 September 1995. Russia operated the Skrunda-1 radar station until it was decommissioned on 31 August 1998. The Russian Government then had to dismantle and remove the radar equipment; this work was completed by October 1999 when the site was returned to Latvia. The last Russian soldier left the region that month, marking a symbolic end to the Russian military presence on Baltic soil.

Civilian toll

The estimated human costs of the Nazi and Soviet occupations is presented in the table below.

Aftermath

In the years following the reestablishment of Baltic independence, tensions have remained between indigenous Balts and Russian speaking settlers in Estonia and Latvia. While requirements for getting citizenship in the Baltic states are relatively liberal, a lack of attention to the rights of Russian-speaking and stateless individuals in the Baltic states has been noted by some experts, whereas all international organisations agree that no forms of systematic discrimination towards the Russian-speaking and often stateless population can be observed.

In 1993, Estonia was noted for having problems concerning the successful integration of some who were permanent residents at the time Estonia gained independence. According to a 2008 report of Special Rapporteur on racism to United Nations Human Rights Council the representatives of the Russian speaking communities in Estonia saw the most important form of discrimination in Estonia is not ethnic, but rather language-based (Para. 56). The rapporteur expressed several recommendations including strengthening the Chancellor of Justice, facilitating granting citizenship to persons of undefined nationality and making language policy subject of a debate to elaborate strategies better reflecting the multilingual character of society (paras. 89–92). Estonia has been criticized by the UN Committee on the Elimination of Racial Discrimination strong emphasis on Estonian language in the state Integration strategy; usage of punitive approach for promoting Estonian language; restrictions of the usage of minority language in public services; low level of minority representation in political life; persistently high number of persons with undetermined citizenship, etc.

According to Israeli author  of the Minerva Center for Human Rights at the Hebrew University of Jerusalem, illegal regimes typically take measures to change the demographic structure of the territory held by the regime, usually via two methods: the forced removal of the local population and transfer their own populations into the territory. He cites the case of the Baltic states as an example of where this phenomenon has occurred, with the deportations of 1949 combined with large waves of immigration in 1945–50 and 1961–70. When the illegal regime transitioned to a lawful regime in 1991, the status of these settlers became an issue.

Author Aliide Naylor notes the lingering legacy of Soviet modernist architecture in the region, with many iconic Soviet structures in the Baltixc states falling into disrepair or being demolished completely. There are ongoing debates surrounding their future.

State continuity of the Baltic states

The Baltic claim of continuity with the pre-war republics has been accepted by most Western powers. As a consequence of the policy of non-recognition of the Soviet seizure of these countries, combined with the resistance by the Baltic people to the Soviet regime, the uninterrupted functioning of rudimentary state organs in exile in combination with the fundamental legal principle of ex injuria jus non oritur, that no legal benefit can be derived from an illegal act, the seizure of the Baltic states was judged to be illegal thus sovereign title never passed to the Soviet Union and the Baltic states continued to exist as subjects of international law.

The official position of Russia, which chose in 1991 to be the legal and direct successor of the USSR, is that Estonia, Latvia, and Lithuania joined freely of their own accord in 1940, and, with the dissolution of the USSR, these countries became newly created entities in 1991. Russia's stance is based upon the desire to avoid financial liability, the view being that acknowledging the Soviet occupation would set the stage for future compensation claims from the Baltic states.

Soviet and Russian historiography

Soviet historians saw the 1940 incorporation as a voluntary entry into the USSR by the Balts. Soviet historiography inherited the Russian concept from the age of Kievan Rus carried through the Russian Empire. It promoted the interests of Russia and the USSR in the Baltic area, and it reflected the belief of most Russians that they had moral and historical rights to control and to Russianize the whole of the former empire. To Soviet historians, the 1940 annexation was not only a voluntary entry but was also the natural thing to do. This concept taught that the military security of mother Russia was solidified and that nothing could argue against it.

Soviet sources
Prior to Perestroika, the Soviet Union denied the existence of the secret protocols and viewed the events of 1939–40 as follows: The Government of the Soviet Union suggested that the Governments of the Baltic countries conclude mutual assistance treaties between the countries. Pressure from working people forced the governments of the Baltic countries to accept this suggestion. The Pacts of Mutual Assistance were then signed which allowed the USSR to station a limited number of Red Army units in the Baltic countries. Economic difficulties and dissatisfaction of the populace with the Baltic governments' policies that had sabotaged fulfilment of the Pact and the Baltic countries governments' political orientation towards Germany led to a revolutionary situation in June 1940. To guarantee fulfilment of the Pact additional military units entered Baltic countries, welcomed by the workers who demanded the resignations of the Baltic governments. In June under the leadership of the Communist Parties political demonstrations by workers were held. The fascist governments were overthrown, and workers' governments formed. In July 1940, elections for the Baltic Parliaments were held. The "Working People's Unions", created by an initiative of the Communist Parties, received the majority of the votes. The Parliaments adopted the declarations of the restoration of Soviet powers in Baltic countries and proclaimed the Soviet Socialist Republics. Declarations of Estonia's, Latvia's and Lithuania's wishes to join the USSR were adopted and the Supreme Soviet of the USSR petitioned accordingly. The requests were approved by the Supreme Soviet of the USSR.

The Stalin-edited Falsifiers of History, published in 1948, states regarding the need for the June 1940 invasions that "[p]acts had been concluded with the Baltic States, but there were as yet no Soviet troops there capable of holding the defences". It also states regarding those invasions that "[o]nly enemies of democracy or people who had lost their senses could describe those actions of the Soviet Government as aggression."

Upon the reassessment of the Soviet history during the Perestroika, the USSR condemned the 1939 secret protocol between Germany and itself that had led to the invasion and occupation.

Russian historiography in the post-Soviet era
There was relatively little interest in the history of the Baltic states during the Soviet era, which were generally treated as a single entity owing to the uniformity of Soviet policy in these territories. Since the fall of the Soviet Union, two general camps have evolved in Russian historiography. One, the liberal-democratic (либерально-демократическое), condemn Stalin's actions and Molotov-Ribbentrop pact and do not recognize the Baltic states as having joined the USSR voluntarily. The other, the national-patriotic (национально-патриотическое), contend the Molotov-Ribbentrop pact was necessary to the security of the Soviet Union, that the Baltics' joining the USSR was the will of the proletariat—both in line with the politics of the Soviet period, "the 'need to ensure the security of the USSR,' 'people's revolution' and 'joining voluntarily'"—and that supporters of Baltic independence were the operatives of western intelligence agencies seeking to topple the USSR.

Soviet-Russian historian  argues that Stalin's ultimatums of 1940 were defensive measures taken because of German threat and had no connection with the 'socialist revolutions' in the Baltic states. The arguments that the USSR had to annex the Baltic states in order to defend the security of those countries and to avoid German invasion into the three republics can also be found in the college textbook "The Modern History of Fatherland".

Sergey Chernichenko, a jurist and vice-president of the Russian Association of International Law, argues there was no declared state of war between the Baltic states and the Soviet Union in 1940, and that Soviet troops occupied the Baltic states with their agreement—nor did violation by the USSR of prior treaty provisions constitute occupation. Subsequent annexation was neither an act of aggression nor forcible and was completely legal according to international law as of 1940. Accusations of "deportation" of Baltic nationals by the Soviet Union is therefore baseless, as individuals cannot be deported within their own country. He characterizes the Waffen-SS as being convicted at Nuremberg as a criminal organization and their commemoration in the "openly encouraged pro-Nazi" (откровенно поощряются пронацистские) Baltics as heroes seeking to liberate the Baltics (from the Soviets) an act of "nationalistic blindness" (националистическое ослепление). With regard to the current situation in the Baltics, Chernichenko contends the "theory of occupation" is the official thesis used to justify the "discrimination of Russian-speaking inhabitants" in Estonia and Latvia and prophesies the three Baltic governments will fail in their "attempt to rewrite history".

According to the revisionist historian Oleg Platonov "from the point of view of the national interests of Russia, unification was historically just, as it returned to the composition of the state ancient Russian lands, albeit partially inhabited by other peoples." The Molotov-Ribbentrop pact and protocols, including the dismemberment of Poland, merely redressed the tearing away from Russia of its historical territories by "anti-Russian revolution" and "foreign intervention."

On the other hand, Professor and Dean of the School of International Relations and Vice-Rector of Saint Petersburg State University, Konstantin K. Khudoley views the 1940 incorporation of the Baltic states as not voluntary, he considers the elections were not free and fair and the decisions of the newly elected parliaments to join the Soviet Union cannot be considered legitimate as these decisions were not approved by the upper chambers of the parliaments of the respective Baltic states. He also contends that the incorporation of the Baltic states had no military value in defence of possible German aggression as it bolstered anti-Soviet public opinion in the future allies Britain and the US, turned the native populations against the Soviet Union and the subsequent guerrilla movement in the Baltic states after the Second World War caused domestic problems for the Soviet Union.

Position of the Russian Federation
With the advent of Perestroika and its reassessment of Soviet history, the Supreme Soviet of the USSR in 1989 condemned the 1939 secret protocol between Germany and the Soviet Union that had led to the division of Eastern Europe and the invasion and occupation of the three Baltic countries.

While this action did not state the Soviet presence in the Baltics was an occupation, the Russian Soviet Federated Socialist Republic and Republic of Lithuania affirmed so in a subsequent agreement in the midst of the collapse of the Soviet Union. Russia, in the preamble of its 29 July 1991, "Treaty Between the Russian Soviet Federated Socialist Republic and the Republic of Lithuania on the Basis for Relations between States," declared that once the USSR had eliminated the consequences of the 1940 annexation which violated Lithuania's sovereignty, Russia-Lithuania relations would further improve.

However, Russia's current official position directly contradicts its earlier rapprochement with Lithuania as well as its signature of membership to the Council of Europe, where it agreed to the obligations and commitments including "iv. as regards the compensation for those persons deported from the occupied Baltic states and the descendants of deportees, as stated in Opinion No. 193 (1996), paragraph 7.xii, to settle these issues as quickly as possible...." The Russian government and state officials maintain now that the Soviet annexation of the Baltic states was legitimate and that the Soviet Union liberated the countries from the Nazis. They assert that the Soviet troops initially entered the Baltic countries in 1940 following agreements and the consent of the Baltic governments. Their position is that the USSR was not in a state of war or engaged in combat activities on the territories of the three Baltic states, therefore, the word "occupation" cannot be used. "The assertions about [the] 'occupation' by the Soviet Union and the related claims ignore all legal, historical and political realities, and are therefore utterly groundless."—Russian Foreign Ministry.

This particular Russian viewpoint is called the "Myth of 1939–40" by David Mendeloff, Associate Professor of International Affairs who states that the assertion that Soviet Union neither "occupied" the Baltic states in 1939 nor "annexed" them the following year is widely held and deeply embedded in Russian historical consciousness.

Treaties affecting USSR–Baltic relations

After the Baltic states proclaimed independence following the signing of the Armistice, Bolshevik Russia invaded at the end of 1918. Izvestia said in its 25 December 1918, issue: "Estonia, Latvia, and Lithuania are directly on the road from Russia to Western Europe and therefore a hindrance to our revolutions... This separating wall has to be destroyed." Bolshevik Russia, however, did not gain control of the Baltic States and in 1920 concluded peace treaties with all three of them. Subsequently, at the initiative of the Soviet Union, additional non-aggression treaties were concluded with all three Baltic States:
 Peace treaties
 Non-aggression treaties
 Kellogg-Briand Pact and Litvinov's Pact
 The Convention for the Definition of Aggression
 The Pacts of Mutual Assistance
 Treaties the USSR signed between 1940 and 1945

Timeline

See also
 Kersten Committee
 Battle of Määritsa
 January 1991 events in the aftermath of the Act of the Re-Establishment of the State of Lithuania, resulting in deaths and injuries
 Litene, where 1,100 Latvian army officers were arrested by the Soviets in 1941
 Museum of Occupations, Tallinn, a project by the Kistler-Ritso Estonian Foundation
 Occupations of Latvia
 Population transfer in the Soviet Union
 Rainiai massacre of Lithuanian political prisoners in 1941
 Russia involvement in regime change
 State continuity of the Baltic states
 Territorial changes of the Baltic states
 United States resolution on the 90th anniversary of the Latvian Republic
 Villa Lituania, the inter-war Lithuanian legation building in Rome, Italy
 Official position of Franklin Roosevelt about Baltic States at Tehran conference, pp. 594–595
 Annexation of Crimea by the Russian Federation
 Republic of Crimea

References

Bibliography

Further reading
 Yaacov Falkov, "Between the Nazi Hammer and the Soviet Anvil: The Untold Story of the Red Guerrillas in the Baltic Region, 1941–1945", in Chris Murray (ed.), Unknown Conflicts of the Second World War: Forgotten Fronts (London: Routledge, 2019), pp. 96–119, 
 Aliide Naylor, The Shadow in the East
 Regarding the Procedure for carrying out the Deportation of Anti-Soviet Elements from Lithuania, Latvia, and Estonia. – Full text, English
 The Global Museum on Communism about the occupation of Estonia by the Soviet Union.
 The Occupation museum of Latvia
 GULAG 113 – Canadian film about Estonians mobilized into the Red Army 1941 and forced into labour in the GULAG
 Soviet Aggression Against the Baltic States by (Latvian Supreme Court justice) Augusts Rumpeters — Short and thoroughly annotated dissertation on Soviet-Baltic treaties and relations. 1974. Full text
 Situation in Soviet occupied Estonia in 1955–1956. Manivald Räästas, Eduard Õun. 1956.

Academic and media articles
 Mälksoo, Lauri (2000). Professor Uluots, the Estonian Government in Exile and the Continuity of the Republic of Estonia in International Law. Nordic Journal of International Law 69.3, 289–316.
 Non-Recognition in the Courts: The Ships of the Baltic Republics by Herbert W. Briggs. In The American Journal of International Law Vol. 37, No. 4 (Oct., 1943), pp. 585–596.
 Alfred Erich Senn What Happened in Lithuania in 1940?(PDF)
 The Soviet Occupation of the Baltic States, by Irina Saburova. In Russian Review, 1955
 The Steel Curtain, Time Magazine, 14 April 1947
 The Iron Heel, Time Magazine, 14 December 1953

External links
 A radio drama about the occupation is presented in "John Alma Johnny and Myra", a presentation from Destination Freedom

 
History of the Baltic states
Baltic
Baltic
Baltic
.
Jewish Estonian history
Jewish Latvian history
Jewish Lithuanian history
Military history of Belarus during World War II
Military history of Estonia during World War II
Military history of Finland during World War II
Military history of Latvia during World War II
Military history of Lithuania during World War II
Military history of the Soviet Union during World War II
Annexation
Communist repression
Politics of World War II
Russians in Estonia
Estonia–Soviet Union relations
Latvia–Soviet Union relations
Lithuania–Soviet Union relations
Estonia–Germany relations
Germany–Latvia relations
Germany–Lithuania relations
1940 establishments in Europe
1941 establishments in Europe
1940 in international relations
1941 in international relations
1940 establishments in the Soviet Union
1940 in the Soviet Union
1940s in Belarus
1940s in Estonia
1940s in Latvia
1940s in Lithuania
1941 in Germany
1941 in the Soviet Union
1942 in the Soviet Union
1943 in the Soviet Union
1944 in the Soviet Union
1945 in the Soviet Union
Germany–Soviet Union relations